Renzo Furlan (born 17 May 1970) is a former tennis player from Italy.

Having turned professional in 1988, Furlan represented his native country at the 1996 Summer Olympics in Atlanta, Georgia, where he was defeated in the quarter finals by India's Leander Paes. Four years earlier, when Barcelona hosted the Summer Olympics, he reached the third round, falling to Jordi Arrese of Spain: 4–6, 3–6, and 2–6. The right-hander reached his highest ATP singles ranking of World No. 19 in April 1996.

His best performance at a Grand Slam came when he got to the quarter finals of the 1995 French Open, defeating Marcos Ondruska, David Rikl, Fernando Meligeni and Scott Draper before losing to Sergi Bruguera.

Furlan kept a residence in Monte Carlo during his playing days.

ATP career finals

Singles: 7 (2 titles, 5 runner-ups)

Doubles: 1 (1 runner-up)

ATP Challenger and ITF Futures finals

Singles: 7 (3–4)

Doubles: 4 (2–2)

Performance timeline

Singles

External links
 
 
 

1970 births
Living people
People from Conegliano
Italian expatriates in Monaco
Italian male tennis players
Olympic tennis players of Italy
People from Monte Carlo
Tennis players at the 1992 Summer Olympics
Tennis players at the 1996 Summer Olympics
Sportspeople from the Province of Treviso